The 1988 Monaco Grand Prix (formally the 46e Grand Prix de Monaco) was a Formula One motor race held on 15 May 1988 at the Circuit de Monaco, Monte Carlo. It was the third race of the 1988 Formula One World Championship.

The 78-lap race was won by Frenchman Alain Prost, driving a McLaren-Honda. Prost took his fourth and final Monaco win after Brazilian teammate Ayrton Senna crashed out late on while leading comfortably. Austrian driver Gerhard Berger finished second in a Ferrari, with Italian teammate Michele Alboreto third.

Qualifying

Qualifying report
The McLaren-Hondas continued their dominant form from the previous race at Imola, as Ayrton Senna took pole position by some 1.4 seconds from teammate Alain Prost, with a further 1.2 seconds back to the Ferrari of Gerhard Berger in third. Berger's teammate Michele Alboreto was fourth, while Nigel Mansell was fifth in the Williams, the quickest of the naturally-aspirated cars, albeit some 3.6 seconds behind Senna. Completing the top ten were Alessandro Nannini in the Benetton, Derek Warwick in the Arrows, Riccardo Patrese in the second Williams, Eddie Cheever in the second Arrows and Jonathan Palmer in the Tyrrell, while among the non-qualifiers was Satoru Nakajima, whose Lotus was powered by the same Honda turbo engine as the McLaren.

Qualifying classification

Race

Race report
At the start, Senna led away, while Berger overtook Prost when the Frenchman momentarily could not engage second gear. Behind them, a variety of accidents occurred at Sainte-Dévote: Alex Caffi hit the wall in his Dallara; Philippe Streiff, who had started 12th in his AGS, retired when an accelerator cable broke; and World Champion Nelson Piquet collided with Cheever, which forced the Brazilian to retire at the end of the first lap and thus end a disastrous weekend for the Lotus team.

The running order of Senna, Berger, Prost, Mansell, Alboreto and Nannini was maintained until lap 33 when Alboreto took Mansell off at the Swimming Pool, ending the Englishman's race. Nannini then suffered a gearbox failure on lap 39. On lap 51, Patrese collided with Philippe Alliot's Lola while trying to lap him; Alliot retired immediately.

On lap 54, Prost passed Berger for second on the run to Sainte-Dévote, though he was some 50 seconds behind Senna. In an effort to put some pressure on his team-mate, he started trading fastest laps with him. With 11 laps remaining, McLaren team boss Ron Dennis radioed Senna to slow down to ensure a safe 1-2 finish, allowing Prost to gain six seconds.

On lap 67, Senna lost concentration at Portier, causing him to spin his McLaren into the barrier and damage the car's front suspension. Immediately afterwards, he went to his home in Monaco to contemplate losing a race that he had dominated from the first time he took to the track for free practice on Thursday morning; the McLaren team did not even hear from him until that evening, when he walked into the pits as they were packing up.

Prost thus took his fourth Monaco win in five years, with Berger some 20 seconds behind and Alboreto a further 21 seconds back. Warwick finished fourth after a race-long battle with Palmer, while Patrese recovered from his collision with Alliot to take the final point, passing the other Lola of Yannick Dalmas on the last lap. Patrese's point was also the first-ever World Championship point scored by a Judd-powered car and his first point for Williams.

Race classification

Championship standings after the race

Drivers' Championship standings

Constructors' Championship standings

References

Monaco Grand Prix
Monaco Grand Prix
Grand Prix